Sulagitti Narasamma (1920 – 25 December 2018) was an Indian midwife from Pavagada town, in Tumkur district of Karnataka state. She performed more than 20,000 traditional deliveries free of charge over a 70-year period of service in deprived regions of Karnataka with no medical facilities. Her work was honored with the National Citizen's award of India in 2012 and the country's fourth highest civilian award, the Padma Shri, in 2018.

Biography
Narasamma was born in Krishnapura, Pavagada village in Tumkur district in Adi Jambava community family. Her first language was Telugu. She did not attend school and grew up illiterate; she married her husband, Anjinappa, at the age of 12. She had 12 children, although four died when young, and 36 grandchildren and great-grandchildren.

She learnt her midwifery skills from her grandmother, Marigemma, a midwife who also helped to deliver five of Narasamma's own babies. In 1940, at the age of 20, Narasamma assisted at her first birth when she helped with the delivery of her aunt's baby.

Narasamma had the opportunity to keep practising her midwifery skills whenever nomadic tribes arrived at her village. She also learned the art of preparing natural medicine for pregnant women and soon became competent in checking the health and position of the baby. She was also reportedly able to detect the pulse of the foetus while in the womb, without the use of any instruments.

By 2018, and at the age of 97 years old, Narasamma had helped to deliver more than 15,000 babies, and has been described as 'the go-to midwife of Krishnapura'.

Awards and honors
Narasamma received the following awards and citations:
2012: Karnataka state government's D. Devaraj Urs award
2013: Kitturu Rani Chennamma award
2013: Karnataka Rajyotsava award
2013: National Citizen award of India
2014: Honorary doctorate from Tumkur University
2018: Padma Shri

Death
Narasamma was admitted to the Siddaganga Hospital and Research Centre in November 2018 and was later referred to BGS Hospitals on 29 November 2018. She died at BGS Gleneagles Global Hospitals in Kengeri, Bengaluru, Karnataka, on 25 December 2018 at the age of 98 of chronic lung disease.

On 25 December 2018, Narasamma's body was kept at Glass House in Tumakuru for the public to pay tributes. Several Ministers, former Ministers and thousands of people from different walks of life also paid their tributes to the departed soul. On 26 December 2018, Narasamma was laid to rest with full state honours at Gangasandra village on the outskirts of the Tumakuru city. Half acre of the one-acre plot was set aside for a memorial.

References

External links
#PeoplesPadma: President of India Confers Padma Awards 2018
Story of Dr. Sulagatti Narasamma, Janani Amma –- Padma Awardee 2018 in Social Work

Social workers
1920 births
2018 deaths
People from Bangalore
People from Tumkur district
Women from Karnataka
20th-century Indian women
20th-century Indian people
Indian midwives
Recipients of the Padma Shri in social work
Recipients of the Rajyotsava Award 2013
Deaths from chronic obstructive pulmonary disease